44P/Reinmuth or Reinmuth 2 is a Jupiter-family comet that is greatly perturbed by the gas giant Jupiter. The diameter of this comet is estimated at 3.22 km and its absolute magnitude at 11.

Discovery 

Reinmuth was discovered during a survey of small Solar System bodies with the 40 cm Bruce telescope at the LSW-Heidelberg Observatory in Heidelberg, Germany. The absolute magnitude of the comet was estimated by Karl Reinmuth to be 13, two orders of magnitude smaller than the current estimate.
This comet was found to be a periodic comet by Leland E. Cunningham in Berkeley, California, who calculated an elliptical orbit with a 7.12-year orbital period. He also predicted that it would come to perihelion again on October 3, 1947. Later, this was revised to 6.59 years and August 19, 1947. The comet ended up reaching perihelion nearly one month after the expected date, and the calculations of its orbit was then refined further until the values were correct.

Relationship with Jupiter 

Reinmuth makes many close approaches to Jupiter. These close approaches gradually change its orbit. For example, on July 16, 2003, comet Reinmuth came within 0.74 AU of Jupiter. This increased its perihelion from 1.89 to 2.11 AU and its orbital period from 6.63 to 7.07 years. On February 11, 2039, Reinmuth will come within 0.52 AU of Jupiter, which will raise its perihelion to 2.44 AU and its orbital period to 7.78 years. On July 21, 2063 and March 1, 2146, Reinmuth will come 0.43 AU and 0.51 AU, respectively. Close approaches like these could raise Reinmuth's perihelion until it ceases to become a comet.

References 
 

Periodic comets
0044
Discoveries by Karl Wilhelm Reinmuth
Comets in 2015
19470910